Toloonops is a genus of spiders in the family Oonopidae. It was first described in 2015 by Bolzern, Platnick & Berniker. , it contains 7 species.

Species
Toloonops comprises the following species:
Toloonops belmo Bolzern, Platnick & Berniker, 2015
Toloonops chiapa Bolzern, Platnick & Berniker, 2015
Toloonops chickeringi (Brignoli, 1974)
Toloonops jacala Bolzern, Platnick & Berniker, 2015
Toloonops tolucanus (Gertsch & Davis, 1942)
Toloonops veracruz Bolzern, Platnick & Berniker, 2015
Toloonops verapaz Bolzern, Platnick & Berniker, 2015

References

Oonopidae
Araneomorphae genera
Spiders of Mexico
Spiders of Central America